"Saint Peter" is a well-known poem by iconic Australian writer and poet Henry Lawson. It was first published on 8 April 1893 in The Bulletin.

The poem references Saint Peter. It was written to music in 1975 by Australian musician Peter Duggan and is now a popular Australian folk song.

Further publications
 Verses, Popular and Humorous (1900)
 Humorous Verses (1941)
 Songs from Lawson (1957)
 The World of Henry Lawson (1974)
 A Camp-Fire Yarn: Henry Lawson Complete Works 1885-1900 edited by Leonard Cronin (1984)

References

1893 poems
Poetry by Henry Lawson